The Antigua Formation is a geologic formation in Antigua and Barbuda. It preserves fossils dating back to the Late Oligocene period.

See also 
 List of fossiliferous stratigraphic units in Antigua and Barbuda

References

Further reading 
 W. A. van den Bold. 1966. Ostracoda from the Antigua Formation (Oligocene, Lesser Antilles). Journal of Paleontology 40(5):1233-1236
 A. P. Brown. 1913. Notes on the Geology of the Island of Antigua. Proceedings of the Academy of Natural Sciences, Philadelphia 584-616
 J. S. H. Collins and S. K. Donovan. 1995. A New Species of Necronectes (Decapoda) from the Upper Oligocene of Anitgua [sic]. Caribbean of Journal of Earth Science 31(1-2):122-127

Geologic formations of the Caribbean
Geology of Antigua and Barbuda
Paleogene Caribbean
Limestone formations
Sandstone formations
Marl formations
Shallow marine deposits
Reef deposits